The 2017 Chinese Taipei Open Grand Prix Gold is the eighth Grand Prix's badminton tournament of the 2017 BWF Grand Prix Gold and Grand Prix. The tournament was held at the Taipei Arena in Taipei, Chinese Taipei on 27 June – 2 July 2017 and has a total purse of $200,000.

Men's singles

Seeds

 Chou Tien-chen (champion)
 Wang Tzu-wei (final)
 Hsu Jen-hao (third round)
 Sourabh Verma (first round)
 Iskandar Zulkarnain Zainuddin (second round)
 Jeon Hyeok-jin (semifinals)
 Chong Wei Feng (third round)
 Khosit Phetpradab (quarterfinals)
 Lin Yu-hsien (quarterfinals)
 Hsueh Hsuan-yi (third round)
 Liew Daren (quarterfinals)
 Vladimir Malkov (second round)
 Suppanyu Avihingsanon (quarterfinals)
 Harsheel Dani (second round)
 Abhishek Yelegar (second round)
 Siril Verma (third round)

Finals

Top half

Section 1

Section 2

Section 3

Section 4

Bottom half

Section 5

Section 6

Section 7

Section 8

Women's singles

Seeds

 Tai Tzu-ying (withdrew)
 Hsu Ya-ching (second round)
 Goh Jin Wei (final)
 Chiang Mei-hui (first round)
 Lee Chia-hsin (second round)
 Lee Ying Ying (first round)
 Chen Su-yu (first round)
 Yeo Jia Min (second round)

Finals

Top half

Section 1

Section 2

Bottom half

Section 3

Section 4

Men's doubles

Seeds

 Lee Jhe-huei / Lee Yang (final)
 Chen Hung-ling / Wang Chi-lin (champion)
 Lu Ching-yao / Yang Po-han (semifinals)
 Chooi Kah Ming / Low Juan Shen (semifinals)
 Chung Eui-seok / Kim Duk-young (quarterfinals)
 Liao Min-chun / Su Cheng-heng (second round)
 Trawut Potieng / Nanthakarn Yordphaisong (first round)
 Nur Mohd Azriyn Ayub / Jagdish Singh (first round)

Finals

Top half

Section 1

Section 2

Bottom half

Section 3

Section 4

Women's doubles

Seeds

 Setyana Mapasa / Gronya Somerville (withdrew)
 Hsu Ya-ching / Wu Ti-jung (first round)
 Lim Yin Loo / Yap Cheng Wen (quarterfinals)
 Chow Mei Kuan / Lee Meng Yean (withdrew)

Finals

Top half

Section 1

Section 2

Bottom half

Section 3

Section 4

Mixed doubles

Seeds

 Choi Sol-gyu / Chae Yoo-jung (semifinals)
 Terry Hee Yong Kai / Tan Wei Han (quarterfinals)
 Wang Chi-lin / Lee Chia-hsin (final)
 Chang Ko-chi / Chang Hsin-tien (first round)
 Goh Soon Huat / Shevon Jemie Lai (first round)
 Liao Min-chun / Chen Hsiao-huan (quarterfinals)
 Chan Peng Soon / Cheah Yee See (first round)
 Lin Chia-yu / Wu Ti-jung (second round)

Finals

Top half

Section 1

Section 2

Bottom half

Section 3

Section 4

References

External links
 Official website
 Tournament Link

Chinese Taipei Open
BWF Grand Prix Gold and Grand Prix
Chinese Taipei Open
Chinese Taipei Open
June 2017 sports events in Asia
July 2017 sports events in Asia